Wisconsin United Roller Derby (WURD) is an all-gender flat-track roller derby league based in Madison, Wisconsin. The league was originally formed in Milwaukee, Wisconsin in 2009 as the first all-men's league in Wisconsin and previously used the names Milwaukee Schlitzkrieg, Milwaukee Blitzdkrieg, and Wisconsin Men's Roller Derby before rebranding as Wisconsin United Roller Derby in August 2019.

History
In May 2009, a few Milwaukee skaters, the core of what would become the Milwaukee Schlitzkrieg, the first men's roller derby team in Wisconsin, traveled to Duluth, near the Minnesota border, for a mixer event with the Twin Cities Terrors.

Milwaukee Blitzdkrieg

In June 2010, copyright issues necessitated a name change, and the Blitzdkrieg was born. Thanks to the Paper Valley Roller Girls hosting a double-header event, the team was able to play its first full game, having performed only in expo games until that point. The Terrors once again travelled to play, taking another victory over the Blitzdkrieg in Appleton, Wisconsin.

The next two years were a long, slow, uphill battle. The team faced challenges in finding practice space, recruiting new members, training, and gaining exposure. But hard work and perseverance began to pay off, as new members came through the door and the city started to take notice. New strategies were tested, modified, and sometimes discarded, training plans developed, and the team traveled extensively throughout the Midwest, learning from mistakes and continually growing stronger.

December 2012 was a turning point, as the team’s application to the Men's Roller Derby Association (MRDA) was unanimously approved by the member leagues, officially making the Blitzdkrieg a nationally ranked team. By the end of 2013 they were ranked 29 in the MRDA 2013 End of Season Rankings.

In January 2014, for the first time, the Blitzdkrieg had built up the numbers to form two home teams, Half Barrel Heroes and Great Lakes Pirates. This gave the team the ability to more easily produce events, and allows more skating time for all players, furthering their development.

Wisconsin Men's Roller Derby

In 2016, the Blitzdkrieg were joined by a new group of skaters in Madison, WI known locally as Mad Men Roller Derby and decided to rebrand as Wisconsin Men's Roller Derby (WMRD). The league played as Wisconsin Men's Roller Derby for the 2017 and 2018 MRDA seasons. At the conclusion of the 2018 season, several key players decided to retire from roller derby and the league chose to go on hiatus from MRDA.  The league remained active and played a series of non-sanctioned bouts in 2019 to focus on rebuilding and gaining experience.

Wisconsin United Roller Derby
In the summer of 2019, the league decided to change its name to better recognize the contributions of women and non-binary members.

Media
2018
March 11, 2018: Mad Men were featured in an article in the Wisconsin State Journal.
2014
March 7, 2014: Milwaukee Blitzdkrieg were interviewed live by Chip Brewster of the Fox 6  morning show, Real Milwaukee.

March 18, 2014: Milwaukee Blitzdkrieg were featured in an article on OnMilwaukee.com

April 25, 2014: A bit of a history on the Milwaukee Blitzdkrieg in Express Milwaukee.com.

2011
January 4, 2011: Milwaukee Blitzdkrieg members were interviewed for the Milwaukee Journal Sentinel.

Home teams

In 2014, for the first time, home teams were established - the Great Lakes Pirates and the Half Barrel Heroes. On March 29, 2014 the Milwaukee Blitzdkrieg held their first ever home team bout. The Great Lakes Pirates took the first win, with a score of 338-101 over the Half Barrel Heroes.

Charter team

Interleague seasons

Stats provided by Flat Track Stats

MRDA rankings

Notes

External links
 Wisconsin United Roller Derby Official Website
 Milwaukee Blitzdkrieg Official Website
 MRDA Website
 Flat Track Stats - Wisconsin United Roller Derby

Men's roller derby
Roller Derby
Roller derby leagues in Wisconsin
Sports in Milwaukee
Roller derby leagues established in 2009
2009 establishments in Wisconsin